WestNet Wireless is a wireless carrier operator based in Calgary, Alberta. In early 2008, WestNet Wireless submitted its application to Industry Canada's wireless auction.

History
WestNet Wireless initially wanted to launch custom solutions wireless. Their WestNet-WireCELL solution was announced in early 2001 and integrates mobile and land-line phones allowing much more flexibility and unlimited local calling. WestNet's main market idea would allow any compatible device on his CDMA network and unlimited local calling. Such calling options and phone activation was unheard of in the industry at the time.

Calgary Wi-Fi network
In 2002, WestNet started to deploy the wide area Wi-Fi network using the 802.11b standard. The first communities were Downtown, Calgary, Radisson Heights, Bridgeland, Victoria Park, Calgary, Forest Lawn, Alberta
As of July 2010, WestNet was said to have over 15,000 wireless users on the public hotspot.

2013 Alberta floods

During the 2013 Alberta Floods WestNet was the only ISP in affected parts of Calgary. Many users, specifically in southeast downtown Calgary, were surprised to see a single Wi-Fi network SSID "WestNet City Wi-Fi". Many citizens left without electricity for three months were recharging their portable devices at WestNet Wireless trucks such as converted ENG vehicles.

US IP address feature
Many Calgarians sign up to WestNet to utilize its tier 1 backbone connection AS815 to the internet. Using this service they may be able to obtain a US-based IP address that many see as a bonus to be able to receive a US IP address.

Custom network

WestNet WireCELL integrates POTS telephone lines and base station controllers; users can operate their land line in the coverage area.

CDMA network
WestNet operates a private CDMA network. A public CDMA network is in the works.

Services

Free incoming texts
In summer 2008, WestNet said it would never charge for incoming text messaging.

Deploying AMPS analog network
Traya announced he would be interested in deploying an Analog network in Alberta as the current networks operated by competitors are decommissioning Analog Services. He projected that many business and consumers still rely on analog as they are built tens of thousands of vehicles and it would not be practical to consumers to shell out thousands of dollars replacing their car phones at auto dealerships.

References

External links
http://www.westnet.ca  WestNet Wireless Home

http://www.ccts-cprst.ca/1617 WestNet joins the Commissioner for Complaints for Telecommunications Services
http://westnet.ca/press/ground_breaking_wireless.htmBusiness In Calgary Article featuring WestNet Wireless
http://strategis.ic.gc.ca/app/ccc/srch/nvgt.do?lang=fre&app=1&prtl=1&sbPrtl=&estblmntNo=234567119439&profile=cmpltPrfl
http://gd.tuwien.ac.at/faqs/allfaqs/comp.mail.maps/UUCP_map_for_u.can.623
http://start.westnet.ca  WestNet Subscriber Start Page

Mobile phone companies of Canada
Telecommunications companies established in 1997
Companies based in Calgary
1997 establishments in Alberta